Chrysoperla is a genus of common green lacewings in the neuropteran family Chrysopidae. Therein they belong to the Chrysopini, the largest tribe of subfamily Chrysopinae. Their larvae are predatory and feed on aphids, and members of this genus have been used in biological pest control.

Taxonomy and phylogeny 
The genus Chrysoperla was first described by H. Steinmann in 1964 as a subgenus of Chrysopa as Chrysopa (Chrysoperla). His original diagnosis based on facial markings was found to be unreliable by B. Tjeder in 1966, who revised Steinmann's subgeneric classification based on details of male genitalia. In 1970, H. Hölzel revised these subgenera further and moved Chrysoperla to a subgenus of Atlantochrysa as Atlantochrysa (Chrysoperla). It wasn't until 1977 that Chrysoperla was elevated to a full genus by Y. Séméria, based on the combination of the absence of a gonapsis in males, lack of carrying a debris packet in larvae, and overwintering as an adult. This series of revisions further caused species to be moved between genera several times as the taxa, particularly Chrysopa and Chrysoperla, were being redefined. The monophyly of the genus was verified in the revision of Chrysopidae genera by Brooks and Barnard in 1990.

Description and identification 
Chrysoperla is one of several green lacewing genera with adults having a pale, yellowish stripe down the middle of the body. It is typically separated from other such genera by the short intramedian cell (im), which doesn't overlap the first crossvein from the radial sector. This genus, however, is defined predominantly based on male genitalia. Chrysoperla is one of six genera possessing an arcuate tignum and three genera to lack a gonapsis. It is distinguished from all other green lacewing genera by the presence of spinellae on the gonosaccus in the male genitalia.

Chrysoperla species may be identical in terms of morphology, but can be readily separated based on the vibration signals used to attract mates. For example, the southern European C. mediterranea looks almost identical to its northern relative C. carnea, but their courtship "songs" are very different; individuals of one species will not react to the other's vibrations.

Distribution 
This genus has a cosmopolitan distribution. Species in this genus are particularly common in both Europe and North America.

Species
There are 67 described species of Chrysoperla. New species of the genus are still being described, particularly since the genus contains at least one cryptic species complex.

 Chrysoperla adamsi (Henry, Wells & Pupedis, 1993)
 Chrysoperla affinis Henry et al., 2003
 Chrysoperla agilis Henry, Brooks, Duelli & Johnson, 2003
 Chrysoperla ankylopteryformis Monserrat & Díaz Aranda, 1989
 Chrysoperla annae Brooks, 1994
 Chrysoperla argentina González & Reguilón, 2002
 Chrysoperla asoralis (Banks, 1915)
 Chrysoperla barberina (Navás, 1932)
 Chrysoperla bellatula X.-k. Yang & C.-k. Yang, 1992
 Chrysoperla bolti Henry et al., 2018
 Chrysoperla brevicollis  (Rambur, 1842)
 Chrysoperla calocedrii Henry et al., 2012
 Chrysoperla carnea (Stephens, 1836)
 Chrysoperla chusanina (Navás, 1933)
 Chrysoperla comanche (Banks, 1938)
 Chrysoperla comans (Tjeder, 1966)
 Chrysoperla congrua (Walker, 1853)
 Chrysoperla decaryana (Navás, 1934)
 Chrysoperla defreitasi  Brooks, 1994 
 Chrysoperla deserticola Hölzel & Ohm, 2003
 Chrysoperla downesi (Smith, 1932)
 Chrysoperla dozieri (R. C. Smith, 1931)
 Chrysoperla duellii Henry, 2019
 Chrysoperla euneura X.-k. Yang & C.-k. Yang, 1992
 Chrysoperla europaea Canard & Thierry, 2020
 Chrysoperla exotera (Navás, 1914)
 Chrysoperla externa (Hagen, 1861)
 Chrysoperla exul (McLachlan, 1869)
 Chrysoperla furcifera (Okamoto, 1914)
 Chrysoperla galapagoensis (Banks, 1924)
 Chrysoperla gallagheri Hölzel, 1989
 Chrysoperla genanigra de Freitas, 2003
 Chrysoperla hainanica X.-k. Yang & C.-k. Yang, 1992
 Chrysoperla harrisii (Fitch, 1855)
 Chrysoperla heidarii Henry et al., 2014
 Chrysoperla insulata (Fraser, 1957)
 Chrysoperla johnsoni Henry, Wells & Pupedis, 1993
 Chrysoperla longicaudata X.-k. Yang & C.-k. Yang, 1992
 Chrysoperla lucasina (Lacroix, 1912)
 Chrysoperla mediterranea (Hölzel, 1972)
 Chrysoperla mexicana Brooks, 1994
 Chrysoperla mutata (McLachlan, 1898)
 Chrysoperla nigrinervis Brooks, 1994
 Chrysoperla nigrocapitata Henry et al., 2015
 Chrysoperla nipponensis (Okamoto, 1914)
 Chrysoperla nyerina (Navás, 1933)
 Chrysoperla oblita (Hölzel, 1973)
 Chrysoperla orestes (Banks, 1911)
 Chrysoperla pallida Henry, Brooks, Duelli & Johnson, 2002
 Chrysoperla plicata (Tjeder, 1966)
 Chrysoperla plorabunda (Fitch, 1855)
 Chrysoperla pudica (Navás, 1914)
 Chrysoperla qinlingensis C.-k. Yang & X.-k. Yang, 1989
 Chrysoperla raimundoi de Freitas & Penny, 2001
 Chrysoperla renoni (Lacroix, 1933)
 Chrysoperla rotundata (Navás, 1929)
 Chrysoperla rufilabris (Burmeister, 1839)
 Chrysoperla savioi (Navás, 1933)
 Chrysoperla shahrudensis Henry et al., 2018
 Chrysoperla siamensis Brooks, 1994
 Chrysoperla sola X.-k. Yang & C.-k. Yang, 1992
 Chrysoperla suzukii (Okamoto, 1919)
 Chrysoperla thelephora C.-k. Yang & X.-k. Yang, 1989
 Chrysoperla volcanicola Hölzel et al., 1999
 Chrysoperla xizangana (C.-k. Yang et al. in F.-s. Huang et al., 1988)
 Chrysoperla yulinica C.-k. Yang & X.-k. Yang, 1989
 Chrysoperla zastrowi (Esben-Petersen, 1928)
 Chrysoperla zastrowi sillemi (Esben-Petersen, 1935)

Provisional taxa 
There are at least 8 additional "song species" that have been identified within the Chrysoperla carnea group but have yet to be formally described.

 Chrysoperla carnea-kyrgyzstan - Kyrgyzstan
 Chrysoperla downesi-1 - eastern United States
 Chrysoperla downesi-china - China
 Chrysoperla downesi-kyrgyzstan - Kyrgyzstan
 Chrysoperla downesi-western - western United States
 Chrysoperla nipponensis-a2 - Asia
 Chrysoperla nipponensis-b - Asia

Gallery

References

External links 

Chrysopidae
Insects used as insect pest control agents
Neuroptera genera